Euchemotrema is a genus of small, air-breathing land snails, terrestrial pulmonate gastropod mollusks in the family Polygyridae.

Shell description
The shell of species in this genus is usually about 8 to 11 mm in diameter (about 3/8 inch). The shells  are brown with a velvety surface, similar to that of Stenotrema, and, in fact, this genus is sometimes combined into Stenotrema. These snails typically have a less complex aperture than Stenotrema: "without a tooth within the outer arc of the lip and with no notch in the basal lip".

There are also peculiarities of the male anatomy that separate the two genera.

Distribution
Euchemotrema is widely distributed in eastern and central North America.

Species 
This genus includes the following species and subspecies:

Euchemotrema cheatumi (R. W. Fullington, 1974)
Euchemotrema fasciatum (Pilsbry, 1940)
Euchemotrema fraternum (Say, 1824)
Euchemotrema fraternum montanum (Archer, 1939)
Euchemotrema hubrichti (Pilsbry, 1940) / Stenotrema hubrichti Pilsbry, 1940
Euchemotrema leai (Binney, 1841)
Euchemotrema leai aliciae (Pilsbry, 1893)
Euchemotrema wichitorum (Branson, 1972) Wichita Mountains pillsnail

References

Polygyridae